Ilse L.-M. Russ was a  cargo ship that was built in 1926 by Flensburger Schiffbau Gesellschaft, Flensburg. She was seized by the Allies in May 1945 at Kiel, passed to the Ministry of War Transport (MoWT) and renamed Empire Conqueror. In 1946, she was allocated to the Norwegian Government and renamed Ekornes. She was sold into merchant service in 1947 and renamed Elfrida. She served until December 1959 when she sprang a leak and sank off the coast of Norway.

Description
The ship was built as yard number 403 by Flensberger Schiffbau Gesellschaft, Flensburg. She was launched in 1926, with completion in August of that year.

The ship had a GRT of 1,600 and a NRT of 942. She had a DWT of 2,600.

The engine was built by Flensburger Schiffau Gesellschaft.

History
Ilse L.-M. Russ was built in 1926 for Schiffart und Assekuranz GmbH. She was operated under the management of Ernst Russ, Hamburg. She was allocated the Code Letters RFVK. In 1934, her code letters were changed to DHMI. In 1936, Ilse L.-M. Russ was one of 20 ships chartered to transport timber from Leningrad, Soviet Union to Germany. In 1940, Ilse L.-M. Russ was one of the ships that was to have taken part in Operation Herbstreise.

In May 1945, Ilse L.-M. Russ was seized by the Allies at Kiel. She was passed to the MoWT and renamed Empire Conqueror. She was placed under the management of William S Scott & Co Ltd. Her port of registry was changed to London. The Code Letters GMXN and United Kingdom Official Number 180700 were allocated.

In 1946, Empire Conqueror was transferred to the Norwegian Government and was renamed Ekornes. Her port of registry was changed to Oslo and the Code Letter LLTS were allocated. In 1947, she was sold to Tetlies Rederi AS, Trondheim and renamed Elfrida. She was operated under the management of Bjarne Tetlie. On 8 December 1959, Elfrida was on a voyage from Archangelsk, Soviet Union to a Danish port with a cargo of timber, when a leak developed in the engine room. The weather at the time was stormy. The ship was discovered capsized with the loss of all 20 crew.

References

External links
Photo of Elfrida

1926 ships
Ships built in Flensburg
Steamships of Germany
Merchant ships of Germany
World War II merchant ships of Germany
Ministry of War Transport ships
Empire ships
Steamships of the United Kingdom
Merchant ships of the United Kingdom
Steamships of Norway
Merchant ships of Norway
Maritime incidents in 1959